Barbara Potter was the defending champion but lost in the second round to Pascale Paradis.

Manuela Maleeva won in the final 7–6, 7–5 against Sylvia Hanika.

Seeds
A champion seed is indicated in bold text while text in italics indicates the round in which that seed was eliminated.

  Manuela Maleeva (champion)
  Barbara Potter (second round)
  Sylvia Hanika (final)
  Dianne Balestrat (first round)
  Stephanie Rehe (first round)
  Jana Novotná (quarterfinals)
 n/a
  Claudia Porwik (first round)

Draw

References
 1988 Virginia Slims of Kansas Draw

Virginia Slims of Kansas
1988 WTA Tour